Princess Antonia of Prussia, Duchess of Wellington, Princess of Waterloo, Duchess of Victoria, Duchess of Ciudad Rodrigo,  (Antonia Elizabeth Brigid Louise Mansfeld; born 28 April 1955) is a British aristocrat and philanthropist. She serves as the president of The Guinness Partnership, an affordable housing community benefit society in the United Kingdom. A member of the House of Hohenzollern by birth, she is a great-granddaughter of Wilhelm II, German Emperor and a great-great-great-granddaughter of Queen Victoria of the United Kingdom.

Early life and education 
Princess Antonia Elizabeth Brigid Louise Mansfeld of Prussia was born in London on 28 April 1955, the daughter of Prince Frederick of Prussia and Lady Brigid Guinness. She is a great-granddaughter of the German Emperor Wilhelm II on her father's side and granddaughter of Rupert Guinness, 2nd Earl of Iveagh on her mother's side. She has a twin brother, Rupert.

She was educated at Cobham Hall School and King's College London, where she earned a bachelor's degree in English.

Career 
In 2008 Antonia was appointed as a fellow of Eton College, serving as a member of the college's governing body. She is also a fellow of King's College, London. She opened Maggi Hambling's War Requiem & Aftermath, a cultural exhibition at King's College.

In 2007 she was appointed as the President of The Guinness Partnership, an affordable housing charitable society in the United Kingdom, and was appointed an Officer of the Order of the British Empire in the 2008 Birthday Honours for services to social housing. Prior to serving as president, she had been a member of the Partnership's Board of Trustees since 1976.

In 2009 she became the chairman of the Royal Ballet School, serving until December 2019. As chairman, she helped lead the school's Healthy Dancer Programme and fundraised for the school's academic programs.

Personal life 
On 3 February 1977, she married Charles Wellesley, Marquess of Douro at St Paul's Church, Knightsbridge in London. When her husband succeeded his father as the 9th Duke of Wellington, she became the Princess of Waterloo, Duchess of Victoria, Duchess of Wellington, and Duchess of Ciudad Rodrigo.

They have five children:

 Arthur Wellesley, Earl of Mornington (born 31 January 1978)
 Lady Honor Wellesley (born 25 October 1979)
 Lady Mary Wellesley (born 16 December 1986)
 Lady Charlotte Wellesley (born 8 October 1990)
 Lord Frederick Wellesley (born 30 September 1992)

References

1955 births
Living people
Alumni of King's College London
Belgian princesses
British duchesses by marriage
Dutch princesses
Antonia
Portuguese duchesses
Antonia
Officers of the Order of the British Empire
Spanish duchesses
English women philanthropists
Philanthropists from London
Fellows of King's College London
Fellows of Eton College
People educated at Cobham Hall School
People from London
English twins
Guinness family
Wellesley family